A smoke grenade is a canister-type grenade used as a signaling device, target or landing zone marking device, or as a screening device for unit movements.

Smoke grenades generally emit a far larger amount of smoke than smoke bombs, which are a type of fireworks typically started with an external fuse, rather than a pin and are more complex. Smoke grenades often cost around  compared to smoke bombs, which can often cost just a few cents. The phrase "to smoke", meaning to fake, bluff, or beat around the bush, comes from the military usage of smoke grenades to obscure and conceal movement; similarly, "pop smoke", derived from a common way of ordering the use of smoke grenades, is used as a slang term for quickly leaving a place.



Design 

A typical design consists of a sheet steel cylinder with four emission holes on top and one on the bottom to allow smoke release when the grenade is ignited. The filler consists of 250 to 350 grams of colored smoke composition (mostly potassium chlorate, lactose, and a dye) in virtually any color. White smoke grenades typically use hexachloroethane-zinc and granular aluminum. The reaction is exothermic and though they remain intact, smoke grenade casings will often remain scalding hot for some time even after the grenade is no longer emitting smoke. Although modern smoke grenades are designed not to directly emit fire or sparks, they remain a fire hazard and are capable of igniting dry vegetation or flammable substances if used injudiciously.

Another type of smoke grenade is the bursting variation. These are filled with white phosphorus (WP), a pyrophoric agent that is spread quickly into a cloud by an internal bursting charge. White phosphorus burns with a brilliant yellow flame while producing copious amounts of white smoke (phosphorus pentoxide). This type of smoke grenade is favored for its ability to produce a very dense and nearly instantaneous cloud of white concealment smoke as compared to the more common solid-filler grenades which expel a slower stream of smoke over a period of roughly 1 minute. For this reason, they are favored for use in onboard grenade launching attachments on armored vehicles, which require extremely fast concealment in the event they are targeted by anti-armor weaponry and need to rapidly retreat.

Use 

Smoke grenades are used for several purposes. The primary use is the creation of smoke screens for concealment and the signaling of aircraft.

If movement (such as flanking maneuvers or retreat) is necessary, smoke grenades can be thrown prior to movement in order to provide a wall of visual distraction that reduces the accuracy of enemy fire and temporarily deceives them as to the force's location. The most common color for concealment smoke is white or grey. With the advent of thermal imaging, which can spot troop movements through smoke screens, the newest smoke compositions now include a "multi-spectrum" component to make them IR impermeable.

Smoke grenades can also be used to signal aircraft. Since locating a target from above (especially in thick forest canopy) can be nearly impossible, even with good radio contact, colored smoke grenades are often used to allow aircraft to spot them. Colored signaling smoke grenades  are widely used in CASEVAC and close air support situations where quickly locating friendly ground forces is of paramount importance. Common colors are red, yellow, green and purple, and all use very brightly colored dyes to increase the likelihood of being spotted from above.

Other uses 

Smoke grenades are functionally identical to many forms of chemical grenades (such as CS gas riot control grenades) and incendiary grenades (such as thermite grenades) which use a fuse to ignite a solid filler inside a steel canister, which then slowly propels the combustion products out through holes in the canister as the contents burn. However, the smoke grenade class is restricted to signaling and concealment under the law of war, and thus they are not considered weapons; since the vast majority are non-explosive, they remain legal for civilian use and ownership in most countries.

Since the basic design of a smoke grenade (a metal canister containing a substance that burns and expels smoke when ignited) is simple, improvised smoke grenade-like devices are ubiquitous across the world. Protestors, football spectators, and airsoft enthusiasts often create their own smoke grenades using common materials.

Smoke grenades by country 
:
M34 White Phosphorus Smoke Grenade
Fabricaciones Militares HC smoke hand grenade
:
No. 80 Mk 1 White Phosphorus Smoke Hand Grenade
Smarex coloured smoke hand grenade series
M18 Colored Smoke Hand Grenade series
M34 White Phosphorus Smoke Grenade
A101 Coloured Smoke Grenade series
A200 Compact Coloured Smoke Grenade series
:
Nebelgranate 75
:
N150 Low Toxicity Smoke Screening Hand Grenade
:
No. 83 Smoke Hand Grenade series
M3BG white phosphorus smoke grenade
M48BG-M52BG white phosphorus smoke grenade series
M68 signal smoke hand grenade series
Nr 11 red smoke hand grenade
NR 405A1 white phosphorus smoke hand grenade
:
Condor SS-601
:
Arsenal GH-SMK-2-W red phosphorus smoke hand grenade
Arsenal GH-SMK coloured smoke hand grenade series (Grey or metallic body with coloured stripe)
Bulcomers Ks GH-SMK coloured smoke hand grenade series (Brown body with coloured label)
:
No. 77 Mk 1/Mk 2 White Phosphorus Smoke Hand Grenade
No. 80 Mk 1 White Phosphorus Smoke Hand Grenade
No. 83 Coloured/Signal Smoke Hand Grenade series
C3 Coloured Smoke Hand Grenade series
C1 HC Smoke Hand Grenade series
Pains Wessex Coloured Smoke Mini Grenade series
C8 Coloured Smoke Hand Grenade series
L83A1 Smoke Hand Grenade
:
P-700 coloured smoke hand grenade series
:
FSL-01
FSL-02
:
Røghåndbombe Nr.77
Røghåndbombe Nr.80
Røghåndbombe M/53
Røghåndgranat M/57
Røghåndbombe M/77
Røghåndbombe M/93
:
Nebelhandgranate 39
Nebelkerze 39 series
Nebelhandgranate 41
Nebeleihandgranate 42
Blendkörper 14
Blendkörper 24
Handrauchzeichen coloured hand smoke signal series
Rauchsichtzeichen Orange
DM25 KM smoke hand grenade
SPIRCO Red Phosphorus Smoke Hand Grenade
Rheinmetall KM smoke hand grenade
Rheinmetall NT smoke hand grenade
RASMO Rapid Smoke Hand Grenade
:
EM-04
EM-12
:
M18 Colored Smoke Hand Grenade series
:
Ordnance Factory Board Smoke Hand Grenade series
:
N150 Low Toxicity Smoke Screening Hand Grenade
:
No. 77 Rookhandgranaat
Nr 7 HC smoke hand grenade series
Nr 9 yellow smoke hand grenade
Nr 10 green smoke hand grenade
Nr 11 red smoke hand grenade
Nr 22 coloured smoke hand grenade series
L68-L71 and L100-L101 Signal Smoke Hand Grenade series (No 83 Mk 4 type)
N150 Low Toxicity Smoke Screening Hand Grenade (No 83 Mk 4 type)
Nr 23 white phosphorus smoke hand grenade
Nr 700 coloured smoke hand grenade series (Rheinmetall NT type)
:
M18 Colored Smoke Hand Grenade series
: 
No. 80 Mk 1 White Phosphorus Smoke Hand Grenade
:
AN-M8 HC Smoke Grenade
M8 HC Røyk Hånd Granat
M88 HC Røyk Hånd Granat
No. 83 Mk 1-Mk 4 Coloured/Signal Smoke Hand Grenade series
NM239 Røyk Hånd Granat
NM248 TTC Røyk Hånd Granat
TTC Smoke Hand Grenade (Commercial version of NM248)
DM 45 HC smoke hand grenade
Defense Technology Military-Style Smoke Grenade series
:
P3 MK1 WP Smoke Grenade
MK1 Target Indication Smoke Grenade series
MK2 Target Indication Smoke Grenade series
:
RGD-2
:
No. 80 Mk 1 White Phosphorus Smoke Hand Grenade
M970 White Phosphorus Smoke Hand Grenade
:
RGD-2
:
M970 White Phosphorus Smoke Hand Grenade
No. 83 Smoke Hand Grenade series
R1M1 White Phosphorus Smoke Hand Grenade
M854A1 Coloured Smoke Hand Grenade series
Red Phosphorus Hand Grenade
M0234 Coloured Smoke Hand Grenade series
M0251 Screening Smoke Hand Grenade
:
KM8 HC Smoke Hand Grenade
KM18 Colored Smoke Hand Grenade series
:
A.T.F.-1 
:
Rökhandgranat m/1937
Rökhandgranat m/51
Rökhandgranat m/56
Rökhandgranat 05 (SPIRCO type)
:
MKE Renkli Sis Kutusu/Colored Smoke Can series
MKE Sis El Bombası/Smoke Hand-Grenade
 (To include British Overseas Territories):
No. 77 Mk 1/Mk 2 White Phosphorus Smoke Hand Grenade
No. 79 Mk 1/Mk 2 Smoke Hand Grenade
No. 80 Mk 1 White Phosphorus Smoke Hand Grenade
No. 81 Mk 1 White Phosphorus Smoke Hand Grenade
No. 83 Mk 1-Mk 4 Coloured/Signal Smoke Hand Grenade series
L35-L38 Signal Smoke Hand Grenade series
L52-L55 Signal Smoke Hand Grenade series
L64-L67 Signal Smoke Hand Grenade series
L68-L71 and L100-L101 Signal Smoke Hand Grenade series (No 83 Mk 4 type)
L83A1/A2 Training Smoke Screening Hand Grenade (No 83 Mk 4 type)
N150 Low Toxicity Smoke Screening Hand Grenade (Commercial version of L83)
L84A1-A3 Red Phosphorus Smoke Screening Hand Grenade (SPIRCO)
N321 Screening Bursting Hand Grenade (Commercial)
N322 Red Phosphorus Screening Bursting Hand Grenade (Commercial)
L132A1/A2 Smoke Screening Hand Grenade
N451/A Compact Screening Smoke Hand Grenade (Commercial version of L132)
L152-L158 Signal Smoke Hand Grenade series
N431-N437 Compact Signal Smoke Hand Grenade series (Commercial version of L152-L158)
N441/A-N448/A Compact Signal Smoke Hand Grenade series (Commercial)
N461-N468 Compact Signal Smoke Hand Grenade series (Commercial)
Primetake Military Smoke Grenade series (Commercial)
Primetake PT4541 38mm Screening Smoke Grenade series (Commercial)
Primetake PT4540 63mm Screening Smoke Grenade series (Commercial)
CTX Screening Smoke Hand Grenade (Commercial)
:
M1 Frangible Grenade (When used with FS filler)
M3 Red Smoke Grenade
AN-M8 HC Smoke Grenade
M15 White Phosphorus grenade
M16 Colored Smoke Hand Grenade series
M18 Colored Smoke Hand Grenade series
M34 White Phosphorus Smoke Grenade
M83 TA White Smoke Hand Grenade
Smith & Wesson No .3 Military Type Continuous Discharge White Smoke HC Grenade (Commercial)
Federal Laboratories M-8 White Smoke Grenade (Commercial)
M106 Screening Obscuration Device
ALSG972 Continuous Discharge Smoke Grenade series (Commercial)
ALSG978 Pocket Smoke Grenade series (Commercial)
ALSG2978W White Smoke Baffled Triple Chamber Grenade (Commercial)
ALSG275 Handball Smoke Grenade series (Commercial)
ALSG973 Triple Action Smoke Grenade series (Commercial)
Combined Systems 5210 White Smoke Canister Grenade (Commercial)
Combined Systems 5210JL Smoke Jet-Lite Canister Grenade (Commercial)
Combined Systems 5211 White Smoke Triple Phaser Canister Grenade (Commercial)
Combined Systems 6210 White Smoke Canister Grenade (Commercial)
Combined Systems 8210 White Smoke Tactical Canister Grenade (Commercial)
Defense Technology Military-Style Smoke Grenade series (Commercial)
Defense Technology Pocket Tactical Smoke Grenade series (Commercial)
Defense Technology Saf-Smoke Triple-Chaser Separating Canister (Commercial)
Defense Technology Maximum HC Smoke Canister series (Commercial)
Defense Technology Saf-Smoke Han-Ball Grenade (Commercial)
Defense Technology Flameless Tri-Chamber Saf-Smoke Grenade (Commercial)
MP-1-xx Color Smoke Grenade series (Commercial)
MP-2-xx Color Smoke Grenade series (Commercial)
MP-2B-xx Color Smoke Grenade series (Commercial)
MP-15-xx Color Smoke Grenade series (Commercial)
MP-2S-xx Color Smoke Grenade series (Commercial)
MP-2S-HC Screening Smoke Grenade (Commercial)

See also 

 Smoke bomb
 Smoke shell

References

Non-lethal weapons
Smoke grenades
Smoke
Pyrotechnics
Sniper warfare tactics